Melway Perth was a street directory for the city of Perth, Western Australia. It was published by Ausway, using indexing and mapping data from Landgate. It competed with the UBD and Gregory's Perth street directories.

History
Perth's first street directory, "Road Maps with Index" was published in 1944 by the then Department of Lands and Surveys. In 1968, the directory underwent a format change and was rebranded as the "Metropolitan Street Directory". The directory was then renamed "StreetSmart" in 1990. In 1996, the street directory became the first in Western Australia to be digitally produced. In 2009 the directory was acquired by Ausway Publishing Pty Ltd and published as "Melway Greater Perth" from the 2010 edition.

Maps
The Melway Greater Perth included a variety of different maps. In addition to coverage of the Perth metropolitan area, the Melway Perth included the following maps:
 Arterial roads
 Perth approaches
 Enlargements of Perth, Fremantle and Mandurah CBDs
 Rottnest Island, with enlargements of major settlement areas
 Enlargements of various universities and hospitals
 Perth Zoo
 Perth railway station
 Perth bicycle network
 Public transport
 Airport maps for Perth and Jandakot airports
 Maps of Albany, Bunbury/Australind, Geraldton and Kalgoorlie–Boulder

References

Perth, Western Australia
Street directories